was a senior retainer under the Toki clan from Akechi clan throughout the latter Sengoku period of feudal Japan. He was the father of Akechi Mitsuhide and brother of "Omi-no-kata" (Saitō Dōsan's wife). His father was Akechi Mitsutsugu (1468-1538)

Samurai
1538 deaths
Akechi clan
Year of birth unknown